= Öresundsparken, Malmö =

Park in Malmö, Sweden

Coordinates: 55°36′15″N 12°58′20″E

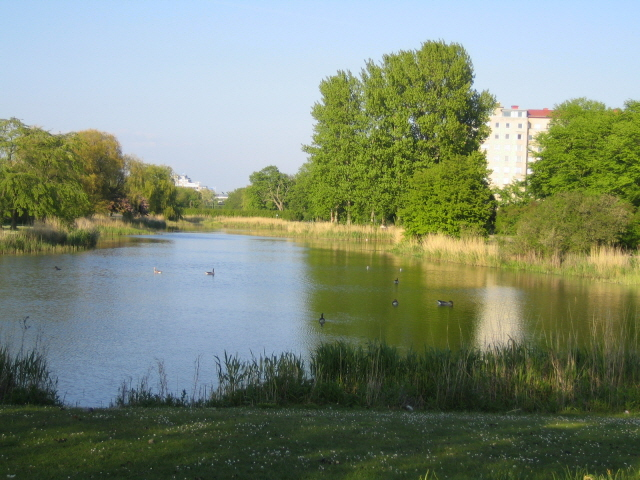

Öresundsparken (English: The Öresund Park) is a park in Malmö, Sweden. The park was built in the 1920s to fill the area beside the railway line. It was opened in 1924 and consists mainly of three ponds. The park is a long narrow area between Ribersborgsstranden and Limhamnsvägen. As early as 1889, the railway, the so-called Sillabanan, was built between Limhamn and Malmö. It ran a bit off the coastline at the time. The park was built in the 1920s to fill in the area inside the railroad. It was inaugurated in 1924 and consists mainly of three ponds.

== History ==
Following the construction of the railway, the area where the park now stands became prone to pools of stagnant water forming, leading to an unpleasant smell. It was decided to create a park as a solution to this problem, and in 1890 the city gardener Johan Christian Wolff presented a proposal for a promenade in the English-Romantic park style.
